Old, the seventh full-length album released by Starflyer 59, was released on Tooth & Nail Records in 2003. A majority of the lyrics of the songs on this album revolve around the theme of growing older, and the album reintroduces Starflyer59's rock-oriented sound.

Track listing
All songs written by Jason Martin.

Personnel
Starflyer 59
Jason Martin – vocals, guitar
Jeff Cloud – bass guitar
Richard Swift – keyboards, background vocals
Frank Lenz – drums, background vocals

Production
Aaron Sprinkle – co-producer, engineer, mixing
Brandon Ebel – executive producer
Michael Christian McCaddon – art direction and design

References

Starflyer 59 albums
2003 albums
Tooth & Nail Records albums
Albums produced by Aaron Sprinkle